Fresnes is a commune in the Val-de-Marne department in the southern suburbs of Paris, France. It is drained by the River Bièvre.

The Fresnes Prison, where Jean Genet was held for a time, is located there.

Name
The name Fresnes was recorded for the first time in a papal bull of 1152 as Fraxinum. This name comes from Medieval Latin fraxinus (modern French: frêne), meaning "ash tree", after the ash trees covering the territory of Fresnes in ancient times.

Population

Transport
Fresnes is served by no station of the Paris Métro, RER, or suburban rail network. The closest station to Fresnes are Antony or La Croix de Berny station on Paris RER line B and Chemin d'Antony station on RER line C. These stations are located in the neighboring commune of Antony,  from the town center of Fresnes.

Mayor
The town hall is situated in front of the Church in the street Pierre and Marie Curie, the Mayor Jean Jacques Bridey was elected in 2012.

Culture
In the MJC Louise Michel you can find a cinema, a theatre and a concert hall.

Education
In Fresnes there are a lot of schools, four kindergartens, five elementary schools. There are three junior high schools and one senior high school/sixth-form college.
Preschools: Barbara, Les Blancs Bouleaux, Les Capucines, Les Coquelicots, Les Marguerites, Les Tulipes
Elementary schools: Barbara, des Frères Lumière, Robert Doisneau, Théodore Monod, Jean Monnet, Louis Pasteur, Emilie Roux
Junior high schools: Collège Jean Charcot, Collège Francine Fromond, Collège Antoine de Saint-Exupéry
Senior high/sixth-form: Lycée intercommunal Frédéric Mistral

The commune is also home to a municipal library, Bibliothèque municipale de Fresnes.

Sports
The AAS Fresnes is the football club of the city, they play at Parc des Sports.

Shopping Centre
In Fresnes there is a mall called la Cerisaie.

See also
Communes of the Val-de-Marne department

References

External links
Official website 

Communes of Val-de-Marne